Marco Pitruzzella, also known as Lord Marco, is an American drummer. Pitruzzella has been a part of numerous bands, particularly within the death metal genre, which includes Anomalous Brain Drill, Vile, Vital Remains, The Faceless and others. He is currently a part of Six Feet Under

Biography 

Marco Pitruzzella was born in Concord, Massachusetts. His family relocated to the Bay Area (California) when he was eight-years old. When he was nine, Pitruzzella began taking drum lessons from Brady Fishler, where he was taught to read sheet music, play jazz, rock, and all the drum rudiments. His drum lessons continued until he was 13, at which point Pitruzzella's passion for metal was born after hearing his first blast beat.

On his 14th birthday, Pitruzzella received his first double bass pedal. Pitruzzella practiced for several hours every day after school, playing to his favourite death metal drummers. He was also active in his school's drumline and orchestra all throughout his schooling career. After graduating high school in 2004, Pitruzzella joined Vörnagar, playing drums on their debut album The Bleeding Holocaust.

In 2005, he drummed for Vital Remains for a big European tour, touring 26 countries and playing 52 shows between August and November. In 2006, he created Brain Drill with guitarist Dylan Ruskin, releasing two albums, The Parasites (EP, 2006) and Apocalyptic Feasting (2008) on Metal Blade Records. He also met Jeff Hughell in 2006 and they both played live for Vile together.

In 2007, Pitruzzella joined The Faceless for a few US tours between March and June. Later that year, he also released his "home made" instructional DVD titled "Lord of the Blast".

In 2009, Jeff Hughell and Pitruzzella released a drum-and-bass death metal EP, titled I Came to Hate.

In February 2010, Pitruzzella officially joined Anomalous and recorded drums for their debut album OHMnivalent.

In 2012, Pitruzzella recorded drums for a Slam Coke song which was his first collaboration under that project. Also in 2012 Pitruzzella did session work for Gurglectomy, Defleshed and Gutted, ABUSE, and Raped by Pigs. He had completed the drum tracks for his band Neurogenic which will be released on Comatose Music in late 2016.

In 2013, Pitruzzella joined Six Feet Under as their full time touring drummer.

In 2015, Pitruzzella joined Sleep Terror as their full time touring drummer.

In 2016, Pitruzzella entered the LONDON BRIDGE Studios (in Seattle) to record drums for SIX FEET UNDER. Which will be the first SFU record to feature both Lord Marco and Jeff Hughell both have been touring members for SFU since 2013.

Pitruzzella has been married since 2006, and has three kids (born in 2008, 2011, 2013) with whom he spends most of his time with while not drumming. He has been playing metal exclusively for 16+ years.

References

American heavy metal drummers
Living people
Six Feet Under (band) members
1985 births
21st-century American drummers
American people of Italian descent
The Faceless members